Yongning is a town in western Guangdong province, China, under the administration of the county-level city of Yangchun. , it has one residential community and 24 villages under its administration.

Notes

Township-level divisions of Guangdong
Yangchun